Białuty may refer to the following places:
Białuty, Sierpc County in Masovian Voivodeship (east-central Poland)
Białuty, Warsaw West County in Masovian Voivodeship (east-central Poland)
Białuty, Warmian-Masurian Voivodeship (north Poland)